East York is a former municipality within Toronto, Ontario, Canada. From 1967 to 1998, it was officially the Borough of East York, a semi-autonomous borough within the upper-tier municipality of Metropolitan Toronto. The borough was dissolved in 1998 when it was amalgamated with the other lower-tier municipalities of Metropolitan Toronto to form the new "megacity" of Toronto. Prior to its amalgamation, East York was Canada's last remaining borough.

It is separated by the Don River from the former City of Toronto. Traditional East York is southeast of the river, and the neighbourhoods of Leaside, Bennington Heights and densely populated Thorncliffe Park are northwest of the river. The heart of East York is filled with middle-class and working-class homes.

History
East York was originally part of York Township, Ontario. Following the incorporation of the Township of North York in 1922, York Township was divided by Toronto, Leaside and North Toronto. With the rapid growth that followed the opening of the Bloor-Danforth (Prince Edward) Viaduct in 1918, the residents of the eastern half of York Township (as an exclave of the western half) felt they had been neglected by the township when it came to roads, sewers and other municipal services. Left with the option to either join the City of Toronto or branch out on its own, 448 East Yorkers voted to incorporate a new township, while 102 voted to amalgamate with Toronto. The Township of East York was incorporated on January 1, 1924 with a population of 19,849. The western half of York Township retained its name.

East York was originally populated by working-class English people who valued the opportunity to own small homes of their own, with front lawns and back gardens. Many had immigrated from Lancashire and Yorkshire. In 1961, 71.7% of the population identified themselves as having British origins.

In the late 1940s, after World War II, East York became home to many returning veterans and their families. Many inexpensive homes were built, including the houses around Topham Park, by the government, to house the returning veterans and the baby boomers. The local government was both socially conscious and frugal, fitting the residents' self-image of East York as filled with supportive neighbours and non-government organizations.

For many years, East York did not allow the serving of alcoholic beverages in any restaurants, etc. The result was a heavy concentration of alcohol-serving restaurants and bars on Danforth Avenue, the main street in the city of Toronto running east-west just south of East York. The prohibition of serving alcohol was eliminated in the 1970s.

The borough of East York was established in 1967 through the amalgamation of the former township of East York and the former town of Leaside. Leaside was a planned industrial and residential community. East York has over the years been a residential enclave for senior citizens, as the original owners from the 1940s age and as younger families move out to suburbs to live in larger houses. East York had its own fire department with three stations, which are still in operation today under the combined Toronto Fire Services. Recently, rapid and accelerated gentrification has changed many neighbourhoods. Many one-story bungalows have added second floors, and many shops have been converted to more upscale shops. Canada's only borough, East York was semi-autonomous within the greater municipality of Metropolitan Toronto.

In 1998, Metro Toronto and its constituent municipalities were dissolved and replaced by the new "megacity" of Toronto. East York's last mayor was Michael Prue who went on to become city councillor for East York, and then a Member of Provincial Parliament for Beaches—East York in 2001. Between 2002 and 2005, the East York Civic Centre's "True Davidson Council Chamber" was used to hold the Toronto Computer Leasing Inquiry/Toronto External Contracts Inquiry.

During the COVID-19 pandemic, many residents of East York stood up against illegal rent increases. This came in the form of protests, rent strikes, and community organizing.

Geography

East York is located not far from the mouth of the Don River. The municipality borders Scarborough to the east, Old Toronto to the west, and North York to the north. East York is located north of Danforth Avenue between the Don River and Victoria Park Avenue.

Demographics

East York's population was 115,185 in 2001. By the 2006 census, the population had dropped slightly (−2.7%), to 112,054.
 
Since the 1970s, the population composition has changed from predominantly British, as East York has become a major arrival point for immigrants, many of whom have established their first Canadian residence in the apartments that became plentiful in Thorncliffe Park, Crescent Town and elsewhere on or near main streets. Almost half of the population in 2001 (45.1%) was foreign-born, and of these, 49.0% had immigrated to the area between 1991 and 2001.  These groups include Bengalis, Indians, Pakistanis, Jamaicans, Filipinos and Sri Lankans. East York also has a well established Greek population and a growing Chinese community. In 2006 the percentage of visible minorities was 38.4%, and the percentage of immigrants was 44.4%.

The religious affiliations of the East York population are consistent with its ethnic composition. Some 63.4% of the population adheres to Christianity, with an almost even split between Catholics (23.6%) and Protestants (25.3%). Christian Orthodox and unspecified types of Christianity make up 12.0% and 2.5% respectively. The largest non-Christian religious group is Muslim, who make up 12.6% of religious adherents, followed by Hinduism (3.7%), Buddhism (1.6%), and Judaism (0.9%). A sizable percentage of the population (17.1%) has no religious affiliation. 

There is also Estonian House which is the unofficial Estonian Consulate in Toronto. The building houses banquets, social events, and an Estonian school.

While English is the dominant language in the area, nearly half (42.6%) of the population reports that their first language was neither English nor French.

Education

Four public school boards provide primary and secondary education for residents of East York, Conseil scolaire catholique MonAvenir (CSCM), Conseil scolaire Viamonde (CSV), the Toronto Catholic District School Board (TCDSB), and  the Toronto District School Board (TDSB). CSV and TDSB operate as secular public school boards, the former operating French first language institution, whereas the latter operated English first language institutions. The other two school boards, CSCM and TCDSB, operate as public separate school boards, the former operating French first language separate schools, the latter operating English first language separate schools.

The East York Board of Education was the former authority of English secular schools in East York, until East York was amalgamated into the City of Toronto in 1998. The Metropolitan Separate School Board managed all separate schools (English and French) until 1998, when the school board was reorganized into CSCM and TCDSB.

In addition to primary and secondary education institutions, East York is also home to a campus operated by Centennial College. The college is a post-secondary institution with campuses located throughout Toronto.

Sports
East York is home to various sports teams. The hockey teams are the Bulldogs, playing in East York Arena, Victoria Village, playing in Victoria Village arena and the Flames, playing in Leaside Memorial Community Gardens. All three leagues offer co-ed (boys and girls) entry level and competitive select hockey for various ages, being played in the North York Hockey League. The East York Lyndhursts represented the Canada men's national ice hockey team at the 1954 Ice Hockey World Championships.

East York is home to East York Soccer, playing at East York Collegiate, Clairlea Soccer, playing at various locations and the Leaside-East Toronto Soccer Club, playing at Leaside High School and Flemingdon, who offer entry level and competitive soccer for all ages. East  York is represented by East York City FC in soccer. East York is home to baseball organizations such as East York and Topham Park. East York provides entry level and AAA baseball for all ages, while Topham Park  provides entry level and competitive select softball. East York is home to a provincially known figure skating club, a gymnastics club, a lawn bowling club, and a curling club.  East York has a skateboarding community group, Team EY, who collaborated with the local skateboarding community to build the East York Skatepark in 2007.

Leaside Memorial Community Gardens, the largest recreation centre in Leaside, provides an indoor swimming pool, an ice rink, a curling rink and a large auditorium.

See also

List of people from East York
List of reeves and mayors of East York
List of neighbourhoods in East York

References

Notes

Citations

Further reading
Davidson, True. 1976. The Golden Years of East York. Toronto: Centennial College Press.
Gillies, Marion and Barry Wellman. 1968. "East York: A Profile." Report to Community Studies Section, Clarke Institute of Psychiatry, Toronto.
Wellman, Barry and Bernie Hogan, with Kristen Berg, Jeffrey Boase, Juan-Antonio Carrasco, Rochelle Côté, Jennifer Kayahara, Tracy L.M. Kennedy and Phouc Tran. "Connected Lives: The Project" Pp. 157–211 in Networked Neighbourhoods: The Online Community in Context, edited by Patrick Purcell. Guildford, UK: Springer, 2006.

External links

East York Historical Society

Populated places established in 1924
Populated places disestablished in 1998
Neighbourhoods in Toronto
Former municipalities in Toronto
Former boroughs in Ontario
1924 establishments in Ontario
1998 disestablishments in Ontario